Centaurea fischeri is a species of flowering plant in the family Asteraceae.

Description

Distribution
These plants are native to Caucasus. They can be found in alpine and subalpine meadows.

References

fischeri